Aleman is an unincorporated community in Hamilton County, in the U.S. state of Texas. According to the Handbook of Texas, the community had a population of 60 in 2000.

History
Aleman was first settled by German immigrants from Washington County. St. Paul's Lutheran Church held the first services in 1886 and was led by Rev. Thomas Kohn, and eventually became the center of the community. It was originally named Pleasant Point but was then changed to Piggtown when it moved a mile to the railroad line in 1907 and was named after Mack Pigg. It was then renamed Aleman, which is Spanish for “German”, and was used by Mexican railroad workers. A cotton gin, a blacksmith shop and a cafe also operated in the community for quite some time. The church remained in Aleman in 1954, as well as a store. A post office was established at Aleman in 1914 and remained in operation until 1943. The community's population was 60 from 1980 through 2000.

Geography

Education
Aleman had an elementary school in 1954. Today the community is served by the Hamilton Independent School District.

References

Unincorporated communities in Hamilton County, Texas
Unincorporated communities in Texas